HMS Stirling Castle was a 70-gun third-rate built at Deptford Dockyard, in 1678/79. She was in active commission for the War of the English Succession, fighting in the Battles of Beachy Head and Barfleur. HMS Stirling Castle underwent a rebuild at Chatham Dockyard in 1699. She was in the Cadiz operation in 1702. The ship was wrecked on the Goodwin Sands off Deal on 27 November 1703. The remains are now a Protected Wreck managed by Historic England.

She was the first vessel to bear the name Stirling Castle in the English and Royal Navy.

HMS Stirling Castle was awarded the Battle Honour Barfleur 1692.

Construction and Specifications
HMS Stirling Castle was ordered on 9 July 1678 to be built at Deptford Dockyard under the guidance of Master Shipwright John Shish. Construction completed, the vessel was launched on 29 July 1679. Her builder's measure tonnage was calculated as 1,059 tons (burthen).

HMS Stirling Castle's initial gun armament was in accordance with the 1677 Establishment with 72/60 guns consisting of twenty-six demi-cannons (54 cwt, 9.5 ft) on the lower deck, twenty-six 12-pounder guns (32 cwt, 9 ft) on the upper deck, ten sakers (16 cwt, 7 ft) on the quarterdeck and four sakers (16 cwt, 7 ft) on the foc’x’le with four 3-pounder guns (5 cwt, 5 ft) on the poop deck or roundhouse. By 1688, she would carry 70 guns as per the 1685 Establishment. Her initial manning establishment would be for a crew of 460/380/300 personnel.

Commissioned Service

Service 1679-1699
She was commissioned in 1690 under Captain Anthony Hastings. She fought in the Battle of Beachy Head in Centre (Red) Squadron on 30 June 1690. In 1691 Captain Benjamin Walters was in command. She was in the Battle of Barfleur as a member of Rear (Blue) Squadron, Rear Division between 19 and 22 May 1692. She also partook in the Battles off Cherbourg and La Hogue on 23 and 24 May 1692. Captain Humphrey Sanders was in command in 1693 with the Channel Fleet.  In 1695 she was under Captain Robert Deane sailing with Lord Berkeley's operations. In 1696 she was sailing in the Soundings. In 1697 she was under the command of Captain Jedediah Barker operating with the Dunkirk Squadron. She would be rebuilt at Chatham in 1699.

Rebuilt at Chatham Dockyard 1699
She was ordered rebuilt at Chatham Dockyard under the guidance of Master Shipwright Daniel Furzer. She was launched/completed in 1699. Her builder's measure tonnage was calculated as 1,087 tons (burthen). She probably retained her armament as stated in the 1685 Establishment, though it is unclear if her armament was changed to the 1703 Establishment later. It is known that when completed her gun armament total at least 70 guns.

Service 1701-1703
HMS Stirling Castle was commissioned in 1701 under the command of Captain John Johnson for service in Sir George Rooke's Fleet for operations at Cadiz, Spain. They sailed from Spithead to St Helens (in the Scilly Islands) on 19 July 1702. The arrived at the Bay of Bulls (six miles north of Cadiz) on 12 August. After many conferences and negotiations, the stores that had been seized were destroyed and the troops were re-embarked on 15 September. On 19 September it was decided to return to England. On 21 September it was learned that a French Fleet and Spanish treasure ships were in the vicinity of Vigo Bay. On the 11th a council of war was held to determine the ships that would initially enter the bay. HMS Stirling Castle was not chosen and remained off the entrance of the Bay of Vigo. She was the Flagship of Sir John Leake in December 1702. Captain Josiah Crow took temporary command in July 1703. By November Captain Johnson was back in command.

Loss
During the Great Storm of 26/27 November 1703, she was lost on the Goodwin Sands. Captain John Johnson perished with his ship. There were 70 survivors from her 349 crew. She seems to have dragged her anchor, slowing the ship's progress towards the Goodwin Sands and meaning that she reached the sands at high tide, narrowly avoiding the fate of the other ships which were grounded. As the storm continued, the tides turned and dragged the ship sideways, trapping her between the new tidal currents and the oncoming storms. The resulting tumultuous seas swamped the ship. Full of water, she sank onto the sands, leaving just the stern exposed for a fortunate few to cling to.

Wreck
Local recreational divers found the wreck in 1979 following a movement of the surrounding sand. The ship was in a remarkable state of preservation, possibly uncovered for the first time since she sank, and numerous artefacts were recovered in 1979-80. Most are held by Ramsgate Maritime Museum but some were first displayed at Bleak House in Broadstairs while it was still a museum, and then moved to the Deal Maritime Museum. A few artefacts have been recovered since, but the wreck was already being covered by fresh sediment in 1981.

The ship re-emerged from the sand in 1998. Scouring of the sand supporting the stern and port quarter led to their partial collapse in the winter of 1999-2000, and the structure has been further destabilised since then. In 2000 a team of divers successfully recovered a Demi-cannon, complete with its original gun carriage from the site. This "Rupertino" gun designed by the king's nephew Prince Rupert, was one of eight delivered by the gun maker Thomas Westerne in 1690. The  gun fired  shot.

In 2002 a wooden fixed block was recovered that may provide evidence on the introduction of the ship's steering wheel, possibly during the refit of 1701. Richard Endsor has argued that the ship had both a steering wheel and the older whipstaff, thus Stirling Castle provides important evidence for the transition between these two mechanisms.

HMS Stirling Castle was designated under the Protection of Wrecks Act on 6 June 1980 by Statutory Instrument 1980/645. The position was updated by SI 1980/1306 the same year. SI 2004/2395 in 2004 redesignated the protected area from a radius of 50 m to 300  around 51° 16.4561' N, 01° 30.4121' E. The wreck has the National Monuments Record number of TR45NW24. In 1980 the wreck was bought from the Ministry of Defence by the Isle of Thanet Archaeological Unit (now the Isle of Thanet Archaeological Society), and in 1982 the Society sold 64 shares in the Stirling Castle to raise funds.

The archive of the Stirling Castle is dispersed over several repositories and is in various stages of preservation. In 2016 Historic England published a report on the conservation work carried out on some of the surface recovered material from the wreck site.

In popular culture
Daniel Defoe alleged that hundreds of sailors escaped onto sandbanks exposed at low tide, but the people of Deal were so busy salvaging goods after the storm that they left the survivors to drown. That many human remains were found in the wreck when she was first uncovered suggests that few managed to escape the wreck.

She was featured on the Channel 4 documentary series Wreck Detectives in 2003.

See also
HMS Northumberland (1679) - sank just south of the Stirling Castle in the same storm, along with :
HMS Restoration
HMS Mary

Notes

References

 Colledge (2020), Ships of the Royal Navy, by J.J. Colledge, revised and updated by Lt Cdr Ben Warlow and Steve Bush, published by Seaforth Publishing, Barnsley, Great Britain, © 2020,  (EPUB), Section L (Lenox)
 Winfield (2009), British Warships in the Age of Sail (1603 – 1714), by Rif Winfield, published by Seaforth Publishing, England © 2009, EPUB 
 Winfield (2007). British Warships in the Age of Sail (1714 - 1792). by Rif Winfield, published by Seaforth Publishing, England © 2007, EPUB 
 Lavery, Brian (2003) The Ship of the Line - Volume 1: The Development of the Battlefleet 1650-1850. Conway Maritime Press. 
 Clowes (1898), The Royal Navy, A History from the Earliest Times to the Present (Vol. II). London. England: Sampson Low, Marston & Company, © 1898
 Clowes (1898), The Royal Navy, A History from the Earliest Times to the Present (Vol. III). London. England: Sampson Low, Marston & Company, © 1898
 Thomas (1998), Battles and Honours of the Royal Navy, by David A. Thomas, first published in Great Britain by Leo Cooper 1998, Copyright © David A. Thomas 1998,  (EPUB)

Further reading

External links
Wreck Detectives, Channel 4

Protected Wrecks of England
Shipwrecks in the Downs
Ships of the line of the Royal Navy
Maritime incidents in 1703
1670s ships
History of Kent
Ships built in England
1703 in England